Yaru Khel , is a village and union council of Mianwali District in the Punjab province of Pakistan. It is part of Mianwali Tehsil.

References

Union councils of Mianwali District
Populated places in Mianwali District